The New Independent Party is an Egyptian political party that is made up of former members of the National Democratic Party.

The party ran in the 2011–2012 Egyptian parliamentary election.

It was formerly part of the Social Justice Coalition, though it later joined the Call of Egypt alliance.

References

Political parties in Egypt